The purple noon's transparent might is an 1896 oil on canvas landscape painting by Australian artist Arthur Streeton. The painting depicts the Hawkesbury River in New South Wales, looking toward the Blue Mountains. The work's title was taken from the poem Stanzas Written in Dejection, near Naples by Percy Bysshe Shelley.

Streeton painted the work in two days while sitting on a ledge above the trees in the hot summer; Streeton claimed the temperature exceeded  in the shade. Streeton later recalled that  he painted in "a kind of artistic intoxication with thoughts of Shelley in my mind. My work may perish but I must work so as to go on".

The painting was included in the 1898 Exhibition of Australian Art in London where a contemporary reviewer claimed it "would hold its own in any London gallery".

The work was acquired by the National Gallery of Victoria in Melbourne in 1896 and remains part of its collection.

References

External links
 The purple noon’s transparent might at the National Gallery of Victoria

Paintings by Arthur Streeton
1896 paintings
Paintings in the collection of the National Gallery of Victoria
Landscape paintings
Hawkesbury River
Water in art